Tarachand Jagshibhai Chheda (14 July 1951-23 April 2022) was an Indian politician and the member of Bharatiya Janata Party. He was a member of Gujarat Legislative Assembly representing Mandvi from December 2012 to December 2017. Chheda was also the Minister of State for Cottage Industries, Salt Industries and Cow Protection from 22 May 2014 to August 2016.
He served people of kutch during COVID first and second waves by serving free medical care in association with government at Anchorwala general hospital, Maska, Mandvi. He was leader of various organisations related with society, animal welfare and health sector. He is in memories of people as dynamic and ambitious leader, who truly cared for people and truly served the society.

He was also a member of Gujarat Legislative Assembly representing Abdasa from 1990 to 1995.

References 

Living people
People from Mandvi
Gujarat MLAs 2012–2017
1951 births
Bharatiya Janata Party politicians from Gujarat
Gujarat MLAs 1990–1995
Politicians from Kutch district